Pulaski County is a county located in the southwestern part of the U.S. state of Virginia. As of the 2020 census, the population was 33,800. Its county seat is Pulaski. Pulaski County is part of the Blacksburg–Christiansburg, VA Metropolitan Statistical Area.

History
Pulaski County was formed on March 30, 1839, from parts of Montgomery and Wythe counties, becoming the 87th county of the Commonwealth of Virginia. It was named for Count Casimir Pulaski, an exiled Polish nobleman who fought during the American Revolution as part of George Washington's army. He joined the army in 1777 and became a brigadier general and chief of cavalry in the Continental Army. He was fatally wounded at Savannah and died on October 11, 1779.

This area of the Blue Ridge has rolling hills and was settled by mostly small farmers, recent Scots-Irish and German immigrants and their descendants who migrated down the Shenandoah Valley from Pennsylvania in the mid to late-18th century. They pushed out or killed most Native Americans in the area. The new settlers were yeomen, who held fewer slaves than in the Tidewater area. Nonetheless, by 1840 about one-quarter of the population was made up of enslaved African Americans. The county had 3,739 persons, consisting of 2,768 free whites, and 971 blacks. Some 17 of the latter were free blacks.

Geography

Claytor Lake State Park, located on the north side of the lake, provides 497 acres of park with camping, cabins, picnic areas, and a swimming beach, as well as a marina. It is named for W. Graham Claytor, Sr. (1886–1971) of Roanoke, Virginia, a vice president of Appalachian Power who supervised construction of the dam and creation of the lake.

Pulaski County has several public boating sites including Harry DeHaven Park, in Allisonia on Rt.639, in Dublin on Rt. 660, and Gatewood Reservoir, a 162-acre water supply impoundment owned by the Town of Pulaski.

Adjacent counties / Independent city 
 Bland County, Virginia – northwest
 Giles County, Virginia – north
 Montgomery County, Virginia – northeast
 Radford, Virginia – northeast
 Floyd County, Virginia – southeast
 Carroll County, Virginia – south
 Wythe County, Virginia – southwest
Law Enforcement

Pulaski County Sheriff is Michael W. Worrell, a law enforcement veteran with twenty plus years of service to the citizens of Pulaski County. He is a graduate of Pulaski County High School and Radford University.

National protected area
 Jefferson National Forest (part)

Major highways

Demographics

2020 census

Note: the US Census treats Hispanic/Latino as an ethnic category. This table excludes Latinos from the racial categories and assigns them to a separate category. Hispanics/Latinos can be of any race.

2000 Census
As of the census of 2000, there were 35,127 people, 14,643 households, and 10,147 families residing in the county.  The population density was 110 people per square mile (42/km2).  There were 16,325 housing units at an average density of 51 per square mile (20/km2).  The racial makeup of the county was 92.60% White, 5.57% Black or African American, 0.15% Native American, 0.32% Asian, 0.04% Pacific Islander, 0.37% from other races, and 0.94% from two or more races.  0.96% of the population were Hispanic or Latino of any race.

There were 14,643 households, out of which 26.90% had children under the age of 18 living with them, 54.90% were married couples living together, 10.50% had a female householder with no husband present, and 30.70% were non-families. 27.00% of all households were made up of individuals, and 11.10% had someone living alone who was 65 years of age or older.  The average household size was 2.32 and the average family size was 2.80.

In the county, the population was spread out, with 20.60% under the age of 18, 7.30% from 18 to 24, 29.20% from 25 to 44, 27.70% from 45 to 64, and 15.20% who were 65 years of age or older.  The median age was 40 years. For every 100 females, there were 97.40 males.  For every 100 females age 18 and over, there were 95.20 males.

The median income for a household in the county was $33,873, and the median income for a family was $42,251. Males had a median income of $30,712 versus $21,596 for females. The per capita income for the county was $18,973.  About 10.60% of families and 13.10% of the population were below the poverty line, including 18.90% of those under age 18 and 11.50% of those age 65 or over.

Economy
The Volvo Trucks North America plant in Pulaski County will begin manufacturing a battery-powered VNR Electric truck model starting in early 2021. It is the largest Volvo truck plant in the world, and the Dublin, Virginia facility currently employed close to 3,000 people building multiple models of heavy-duty trucks.

Schools

Secondary and Higher Education
 New River Community College
 Southwest Virginia Governor School
 Pulaski County High School

Middle schools
 Pulaski County Middle School

Elementary schools
 Pulaski Elementary School
 Dublin Elementary School
 Critzer Elementary School
 Riverlawn Elementary School
 Snowville Elementary School

Communities

Towns
 Dublin
 Pulaski

Census-designated places

 Allisonia
 Belspring
 Draper
 Fairlawn
 Hiwassee
 New River
 Parrott
 Snowville

Other unincorporated communities
 Caseknife
 Claytor Lake
 Newbern
 Wurno
 Little Creek
 Delton
 Tinytown

Politics

Pulaski County reps in state government
 James A. Walker
 James Hoge Tyler

See also
 National Register of Historic Places listings in Pulaski County, Virginia

References

External links
 Claytor Lake Online Website
 Pulaski County, Virginia official website
 Claytor Lake State Park (Virginia)
 Virginia Dept. of Game and Inland Fisheries, Claytor Lake webpage

 
1839 establishments in Virginia
Populated places established in 1839
Virginia counties
Blacksburg–Christiansburg metropolitan area
Counties of Appalachia